Pleasant Township is one of the fifteen townships of Putnam County, Ohio, United States.  The 2000 census found 3,955 people in the township, 1,755 of whom lived in the unincorporated portions of the township.

Geography
Located in the southern part of the county, it borders the following townships:
Ottawa Township - north
Blanchard Township - northeast corner
Riley Township - east
Richland Township, Allen County - southeast
Monroe Township, Allen County - south
Sugar Creek Township - southwest
Union Township - west

The village of Columbus Grove is located in southern Pleasant Township.

Name and history
Pleasant Township was organized in 1834. It is one of fifteen Pleasant Townships statewide.

Government
The township is governed by a three-member board of trustees, who are elected in November of odd-numbered years to a four-year term beginning on the following January 1. Two are elected in the year after the presidential election and one is elected in the year before it. There is also an elected township fiscal officer, who serves a four-year term beginning on April 1 of the year after the election, which is held in November of the year before the presidential election. Vacancies in the fiscal officership or on the board of trustees are filled by the remaining trustees.

References

External links
County website

Townships in Putnam County, Ohio
Townships in Ohio